Société de transport du Saguenay (STS) is the public transport company in Saguenay, Quebec, Canada, formerly the Corporation intermunicipale de transport du Saguenay (CITS). They operate from three main terminals located in the boroughs of Chicoutimi, Jonquière and La Baie. The network covers a large part of the city including industrial, commercial and residential areas, with interurban links between the former municipalities and to the townships of Laterrière in the south and Shipshaw and Tremblay in the north.

Services
A variety of services is provided including: regular public transit; specialized transport for people with disabilities; school bus services; charter coach services; special events transportation. To use the paratransit service, you must complete an eligibility form and be approved by a committee composed of health care professionals, people representing persons with disabilities and a member of the company.

Routes

Regular Routes
4 - Centre d'achat via Université
10 - Notre Dame du Saguenay
11 - St. Paul
11C - Chicoutimi via St. Paul
11J - Jonquière via St. Paul
12 - Riviere-du-Moulin
14 - Coopérative
15N - Centre-ville via Talbot/centres d'achats
15S - Boulevard du Royaume via centres d'achats/Talbot
16 - Côte de la Réserve
18/18J - Des Écrivains
20 - Sainte-Claire
21 - Boulevard Sainte-Geneviève
22 - Vanier/Constantin
23 - Aréna du Plateau via Côte Verdun
24 - Saint-Luc
30 - Les Galeries
31 - Saint-Raphaël
32 - Saint-Georges
33 - Saint-André
34 - Kénogami
35 - Des Oiseaux/Petite-France
36 - Cépal
37 - Terminus Jonquière via Ste-Émilie/Faubourg Sagamie via Cégep
38 - Saint-Jacques/Plateau Deschênes
39 - Carré Davis/Saint-Philippe
43 - Faubourg vers Rond-Point
50 - Des Érables
51 - Polyvalente La Baie
52 - Boulevard de la Grande-Baie
54 - Chemin St-Louis
60 - Secteur de Laterrière/St-Pierre - St-Paul
62 - Secteur de Laterrière/St-Isidore - de l'Église

Long Distance Routes
2 - Chicoutimi/Jonquière via Boulevard de Royaume
3 - Chicoutimi/Jonquière via Boulevard du Saguenay
5 - La Baie/Chicoutimi via Boulevard St-Jean-Baptiste
6 - La Baie/Chicoutimi via Aéroport
65 - Chicoutimi à Canton Tremblay/Shipshaw/St-Ambroise
67 - Jonquière à Shipshaw/St-Ambroise

References

Saguenay
Transport in Saguenay, Quebec